Alethopteris is a prehistoric plant genus of fossil  Pteridospermatophyta (seed ferns) that developed in the Carboniferous period (around ).

It is in the family Alethopteridaceae. The genus Alethopteris is among the seed ferns (Pteridospermales), an extinct group of gymnosperms. Although their foliage resembled that of modern ferns, they reproduced by means of seeds.

See also
Coal forest

References 

Pteridospermatophyta
Carboniferous plants
Prehistoric plant genera
Carboniferous first appearances
Carboniferous extinctions
Fossils of Georgia (U.S. state)
Paleozoic life of New Brunswick
Paleozoic life of Nova Scotia
Paleozoic life of Prince Edward Island
Prehistoric plants of North America